Hiroki Kita  (born October 29, 1969) is a Japanese mixed martial artist. He competed in the Bantamweight division.

Mixed martial arts record

|-
| Loss
| align=center| 2-6-1
| Yoshitaka Okigi
| Submission (armbar)
| Shooto: Gig Tokyo 3
| 
| align=center| 1
| align=center| 3:28
| Tokyo, Japan
| 
|-
| Loss
| align=center| 2-5-1
| Hayate Usui
| Decision (unanimous)
| Shooto: Battle Mix Tokyo 1
| 
| align=center| 2
| align=center| 5:00
| Tokyo, Japan
| 
|-
| Loss
| align=center| 2-4-1
| Akitoshi Hokazono
| TKO (punches)
| Shooto: 7/13 in Korakuen Hall
| 
| align=center| 1
| align=center| 3:07
| Tokyo, Japan
| 
|-
| Loss
| align=center| 2-3-1
| Hiroshi Umemura
| Decision (unanimous)
| Shooto: Gig Central 3
| 
| align=center| 2
| align=center| 5:00
| Nagoya, Aichi, Japan
| 
|-
| Loss
| align=center| 2-2-1
| Akira Komatsu
| Decision (unanimous)
| Shooto: Treasure Hunt 9
| 
| align=center| 2
| align=center| 5:00
| Setagaya, Tokyo, Japan
| 
|-
| Win
| align=center| 2-1-1
| Manabu Kano
| Decision (unanimous)
| Shooto: Wanna Shooto Japan
| 
| align=center| 2
| align=center| 5:00
| Setagaya, Tokyo, Japan
| 
|-
| Win
| align=center| 1-1-1
| Akira Kibe
| Decision (majority)
| Shooto: Gig East 7
| 
| align=center| 2
| align=center| 5:00
| Tokyo, Japan
| 
|-
| Draw
| align=center| 0-1-1
| Daiji Takahashi
| Draw
| Shooto: R.E.A.D. 11
| 
| align=center| 2
| align=center| 5:00
| Setagaya, Tokyo, Japan
| 
|-
| Loss
| align=center| 0-1
| Norio Nishiyama
| Decision (unanimous)
| Shooto: Shooter's Ambition
| 
| align=center| 2
| align=center| 5:00
| Setagaya, Tokyo, Japan
|

See also
List of male mixed martial artists

References

1969 births
Japanese male mixed martial artists
Bantamweight mixed martial artists
Living people